Kuryu is a Japanese surname. Notable people with the surname include:

 Akira Kuryu (born 1947), Japanese architect
 Shun'ichi Kuryu (born 1958), Japanese bureaucrat

See also
 Kuryu Rakusen-en Sanatorium

Japanese-language surnames